is a train station in Higashi-ku, Niigata, Niigata Prefecture, Japan, operated by East Japan Railway Company (JR East).

Lines
Echigo-Ishiyama Station is served by the Shin'etsu Main Line, and is 132.2 kilometers from the starting point of the line at Naoetsu Station. The station is staffed.

Layout
The station consists of two ground-level opposed side platforms, serving two tracks. There is an underground passage outside the gate.

Platforms

History
The station opened on 1 November 1960. With the privatization of Japanese National Railways (JNR) on 1 April 1987, the station came under the control of JR East.

Passenger statistics
In fiscal 2017, the station was used by an average of 2,063 passengers daily (boarding passengers only).

Surrounding area
 Ishiyama Middle School
 Nakanoyama Elementary School

See also
 List of railway stations in Japan

References

External links
 JR East station information 

Railway stations in Niigata (city)
Shin'etsu Main Line
Railway stations in Japan opened in 1960
Stations of East Japan Railway Company